Guerra de vecinos (English title The War Next-door) is a Mexican comedy streaming television series. The series premiered on Netflix on 7 July 2021. On 30 July 2021, the series was renewed for a second season, which premiered on June 17, 2022.

Cast 

 Vanessa Bauche as Leonor Salcido
 Ana Layevska as Silvia Espinoza
 Pascacio López as Genaro
 Elyfer Torres as Tere
 Loreto Peralta as Crista 
 Mark Tacher as Ernesto
 Armando Said as Pablo
Marco León as Diego
Christian Vázquez as Tomas
Sara Isabel Quintero as Dolores

Episodes

References

External links 

 
 

Mexican television series
Mexican comedy
Hispanic and Latino American actors